Guillermo Castellanos (born 6 November 1959) is a Mexican sports shooter. He competed in the mixed trap event at the 1984 Summer Olympics.

References

1959 births
Living people
Mexican male sport shooters
Olympic shooters of Mexico
Shooters at the 1984 Summer Olympics
Place of birth missing (living people)